Aetos F.C. was a Greek football club, based in Skydra, Greece.

External links
Official website 
Club page at EPAE.org 

Football clubs in Central Macedonia
Association football clubs established in 1952
1952 establishments in Greece